() or , among other Chinese names, is a heavily oxidized, non-roasted, tip-type oolong tea originating in Hsinchu County, Taiwan. It is an insect tea produced from leaves bitten by the tea jassid, an insect that feeds on the tea plant. Terpenes are released in the bitten leaves, which creates a honey-like taste.

The tea has natural fruity and honey-like aromas and produces a sweet-tasting beverage, bright reddish-orange in color, without any bitterness. Dried leaves of high quality exhibit a pleasant aroma, with leaf coloration of dark purple and brown tones with white hairs.

Production
 is produced from a variety of cultivars of the tea plant, Camellia sinensis, that are grown without insecticides to encourage a common pest, the tea jassid (Jacobiasca formosana), to feed on the leaves, stems, and buds.  These insects suck the phloem juices of the tea stems, leaves, and buds. This leads to the plant's defensive production of monoterpene diol and hotrienol which give the tea its unique flavor.  The buds then turn white along the edges which gives the tea its alternate name, white-tip oolong.  The insect bites start the oxidation of the leaves and tips and add a sweet note to the tea.

This process has inspired makers of other types of tea, such as  oolong and the east-coast black teas of Hualien and Taitung Counties, to withhold insecticide use in order to replicate this process in other teas.

Because of the need for Jacobiasca formosana feeding, the tea must be grown in warmer areas.  In Taiwan, it is primarily grown in Hakka areas of the hilly northwestern part of the country at lower altitudes (300–800m) between the mountains and the plains.  Beipu and Emei in Hsinchu County are noted centers of production with Beipu being the site of the Beipu Penghong Tea Museum and hosting the annual Penghong Tea Industry and Culture Festival.

The tea bushes are planted on the leeward side of hills in areas with sufficient humidity and sunshine.  The tea is only harvested in the middle of summer, only about 40–50% of the leaves can be used, and the harvest is susceptible to drought.  Therefore, the annual yield is low and the price is relatively high.

After being harvested from young leaves and tips in the summer, the tea is heavily oxidized (around 70%), approaching the level of black tea. Unlike other oolongs, which typically make use of the top four or five leaves and the single bud,  uses only the bud and two leaves. This longer withering period accelerates the hydrolysis and oxidation processes which help generate the typical sweet flavor and taste of this tea.

Preparation
 is brewed with lower temperature water (80°C–85°C) than is typical for other oolongs.  It also requires a longer brewing (1–2 minutes for the first pot and then longer for subsequent brewings).  Like other oolongs, the leaves can be steeped multiple times.

History and names
This variety of tea originated in the late 19th century, when Taiwan first exported oolong tea. Tea merchant John Dodd exported this tea to the west from his Tamsui base.

More recently, the term , translated as 'white-tip oolong tea' has been used. Beginning in the 1970s, the term Oriental has become generally and increasingly disfavored in some Western countries.

In Taiwanese, farmers originally used names that referred to the insect pest that plagues the plant. As the tea began fetching higher prices,  ('bragging or bluffing tea') became the common name. In Siyen Hakka, in addition to the name  (also 'bragging/bluffing tea'), the term  is also used.

Popular stories as to the origin of the tea and its names abound.  For example:

See also
Taiwanese tea
Taiwanese tea culture
Oolong tea

References

External links
Hsinchu County Oriental Beauty — photos and text on the production and preparation of  tea
"Puff Tea" – The Eastern Beauty Tea

Insect products
Oolong tea
Taiwanese tea